Blewett is a surname. Notable people with the surname include:

Alexander (Zander) Blewett, III (b. 1945), US lawyer
Anders Blewett (b. 1980), US politician
Bob Blewett (1877–1958), US baseball player
Curtis Blewett, Canadian sailor 
Edward Blewett (1848–1929), US owner of mines
George Blewett (1873–1912), Canadian academic and philosopher
Greg Blewett (b. 1971), Australian cricketer
Hildred Blewett (1911–2004), Canadian physicist
Jean Blewett (1862–1934), Canadian writer
Jimmy Blewett (b. 1980), US NASCAR driver
Joan Warnow-Blewett (1931–2006), US archivist
John Blewett III (1973–2007), US NASCAR driver
John P. Blewett (1910–2000), Canadian-American physicist
Joseph Blewett (1925–2013), South African cricketer
Kate Blewett (fl. 1990s–present), British documentary filmmaker
Kerry Blewett (b. 1986), British life guard
Mary Blewett (b. 1938), US author and historian
Neal Blewett (b. 1933), Australian politician and political science academic
Scott Blewett (b. 1996), US baseball player
Tristan Blewett (b. 1996), South African rugby player

See also
Blewett, Washington, a small mining town in the US state of Washington
Blewett Falls Lake, a man-made lake on the Great Pee Dee River in the US state of North Carolina
Blewett Pass, a pass in the Cascade Range of mountains in the US state of Washington
Hinton Blewett, a village and civil parish in Somerset, England
22927 Blewett, a main-belt asteroid which was discovered in 1999
Blewit, two species of edible mushrooms
Blewitt, a surname
Bluet (disambiguation)
Bluett, a surname
Bluiett, a surname